Lev Nikolaevich Zaikov (Russian:Лев Никола́евич Зайко́в; April 3, 1923, Tula, RSFSR, USSR – January 7, 2002, St. Petersburg, Russia) was a Soviet politician and statesman. Member of the Politburo of the CPSU Central Committee, and secretary of the CPSU Central Committee.

Honours and awards
 Hero of Socialist Labour

References

External links 
 Lev Zaykov

1923 births
2002 deaths
Burials at Serafimovskoe Cemetery
Heroes of Socialist Labour
Recipients of the Order of Lenin
Recipients of the USSR State Prize
Politburo of the Central Committee of the Communist Party of the Soviet Union members
Governors of Saint Petersburg
Tenth convocation members of the Soviet of the Union
Eleventh convocation members of the Soviet of the Union